Romano Bobone (died 1189, Rome) was an Italian cardinal.

Life
His year and place of birth are unknown, but this is presumed to be Rome, where his family was already well-represented in the Roman Curia. He and cardinal Soffredo were made papal legates to Philip II of France and Henry II of England, negotiating a two-year truce between them. On 21 March 1188, pope Clement III made him cardinal deacon of San Giorgio in Velabro. According to Aubery, he moved to a church in Porto.

See also
Catholic Church in Italy

References

External links
https://books.google.com/books?id=ZrQAAAAAMAAJ&pg=PA261&lpg=PA261&dq=cardinale+bobone+orsini&source=web&ots=yWMuhpzfjH&sig=wH9_wFH92YcqOix0RhzxXKBPG5E&hl=it

1189 deaths
12th-century Italian cardinals